Catherine Hélène is a French politician from Saint Pierre and Miquelon, who is the Second Vice-President of the Territorial Council of Saint Pierre and Miquelon. She was appointed to the role in October 2017. In 2019 she helped to lead national mourning for Jacques Chirac in the territory. She is a member of the political party Archipelago Tomorrow. She is a member of a number of committees, including those for the environment, public health, disability and philately. She is also a member of the National Biodiversity Committee of France.

References 

Living people
Year of birth missing (living people)
Members of the Territorial Council of Saint Pierre and Miquelon
Saint Pierre and Miquelon politicians
Saint Pierre and Miquelon women in politics
21st-century French women politicians
People from Saint Pierre and Miquelon
Archipelago Tomorrow politicians